Property NSW is a statutory body of the Government of New South Wales that manages the State's significant property portfolio and its places. Formed on 1 July 2016, Property NSW encompasses the entities of the former Government Property NSW (GPNSW), the former Sydney Harbour Foreshore Authority (SHFA), Teacher Housing Authority of NSW (THA) and Waste Assets Management Corporation (WAMC).

Services provided by Property NSW include:
 leading property reform
 active portfolio and asset management
 delivering transactions and major projects
 place making and heritage conservation, and
 valuation services

The authority is led by Deputy Director-General, presently Brett Newman, who reports to the Director General of the Department of Finance, Services and Innovation, presently Martin Hoffman, who reports to the Minister for Finance, Services and Property, presently the Honourable Victor Dominello MP.

References

External links
Property NSW website

Property